Rafael Lima Pereira (born 1 April 1993), commonly known as Rafinha is a Brazilian footballer who plays for Mexican club Cafetaleros as a winger.

After graduating from the youth team of Flamengo, Rafinha broke into the first team in 2013. After a series of loan deals, he left the club and joined Avaí in 2018.

Club career
Born in Porto Franco, Rafinha represented CFZ, CFZ Brasília and Flamengo as a youth. After winning the 2011 Copa São Paulo de Futebol Júnior, he was given the nickname "Neymar da Gávea" (Neymar of Gávea). On 27 February 2013, he was promoted to the main team, signing a deal which would keep him at the club till 2018. His contract termination fee was set at R$130 million (approx £26 million at January 2018) for foreign clubs and R$23 million (approx £5m) for Brazilian clubs. He also thanked Zico, saying that he was grateful to him not only as a player but also as a person. Rafinha's monthly salary was increased from R$3,000 (£660) to R$20,000 (£4,400), a salary hike of 566%.

Rafinha scored his first goal for Fla in a 4–2 victory against Vasco da Gama. He played 44 matches in the season with his side winning the 2013 Copa do Brasil.

On 7 January 2014, Rafinha joined Bahia on a year long loan deal, which saw Feijão moving to the opposite side. In the following January he was loaned to Atlético Goianiense after becoming surplus to Flamengo's requirements.  He made his Goiano debut against Anapolina, scoring a goal in the 1–0 victory. However, his form dipped since then and he failed to cement his position in the first team; resulting in the club releasing him on 1 July.

On 4 July 2015, Rafinha was loaned to South Korean club Daejon Citizen. On 23 January 2016, he was loaned to Metropolitano. In 2017, he was loaned off again, this time on a six-month deal to Thai club Thai Honda. On 3 January 2018, Rafinha moved to Avaí.

On 24 December 2018, Rafinha moved abroad and joined Mexican club Cafetaleros.

Career statistics

Honours
Flamengo
 Copa do Brasil: 2013

References

External links

1993 births
Living people
Association football forwards
Brazilian footballers
Campeonato Brasileiro Série A players
Campeonato Brasileiro Série B players
CR Flamengo footballers
Esporte Clube Bahia players
Club Athletico Paranaense players
Clube Atlético Metropolitano players
Avaí FC players
K League 1 players
Daejeon Hana Citizen FC players
Thai Honda F.C. players
Ascenso MX players
Cafetaleros de Chiapas footballers
Brazilian expatriate footballers
Brazilian expatriate sportspeople in Thailand
Expatriate footballers in South Korea
Expatriate footballers in Mexico
Brazilian expatriate sportspeople in South Korea
Expatriate footballers in Thailand